

National team competitions

Men's Division 
 1978 FIBA Basketball World Cup in Quezon City and Manila:
   (win world title via OT, 82–81)
  
  
 1978 FIBA Oceania Championship in New Zealand:
   (wins Best-of-3 series, 2–1)
  
 AfroBasket 1978 in Dakar:
   (Win African title, 103–72)

Women's Division 
 1978 FIBA Asia Women's Cup in Kuala Lumpur:

Youth Division 
 1978 FIBA Europe Under-18 Championship in Italy:
   (Win European title, 104–100)

Professional club seasons

Player awards (NBA)

Regular Season MVP 
Bill Walton, Portland Trail Blazers

NBA Finals MVP 
Wes Unseld, Washington Wizards
 CSP Limoges were promoted to the first division of the French championship (future Pro A)

Naismith Memorial Basketball Hall of Fame
Class of 1978:
Paul Arizin
Joe Fulks
Cliff Hagan
Jim Pollard

Births
 June 19 — Dirk Nowitzki, NBA player
 August 23 — Kobe Bryant, NBA player (died 2020)

Deaths
May 8 — Chuck Hyatt, 70, American Hall of Fame college player (Pittsburgh).
June 6 — Paul Lambert, 43, American college coach (Pittsburg State, Hardin–Simmons, Southern Illinois).
June 30 — Bob Matheny, 49, All-American college player (California)
August 15 — Mike Novak, 63, American NBA, BAA and NBL player.
September 11 — Omar Browning, 66, American AAU player and coach of the 1948 Olympic champions.
September 24 — Bob Kramer, 56, American NBL player (Oshkosh All-Stars, Youngstown Bears).
September 28 — Neil Johnston, 49, American Hall of Fame player (Philadelphia Warriors).
November 11 — Bennie Borgmann, 77, American Hall of Fame player (Original Celtics).

See also

 1978 in sports

References